Halil Akbunar (born 9 November 1993) is a Turkish professional footballer who plays as a winger for Eyüpspor and the Turkey national team.

Career
Halil was promoted to the senior team of Göztepe in January 2012 after graduating from their youth academy. Halil made his professional debut for Göztepe in a Süper Lig 2–2 tie with Fenerbahçe, on 12 August 2017.

On 4 July 2022, he signed a three-year contract with Westerlo in Belgium.

On 12 January 2023, Akbunar returned to Turkey and signed a three-and-a-half-year contract with Eyüpspor.

International career
He made his senior debut for Turkey on 27 March 2021 in a World Cup qualifier against Norway.

Career statistics

Club

International

Honors
Göztepe
TFF Second League: 2014-15
TFF First League, Play-offs winner: 2016-17

References

External links
 
 
 
 

1993 births
People from Konak
Living people
Turkish footballers
Turkey youth international footballers
Turkey international footballers
Association football wingers
Göztepe S.K. footballers
Elazığspor footballers
K.V.C. Westerlo players
Eyüpspor footballers
Süper Lig players
TFF First League players
Belgian Pro League players
Turkish expatriate footballers
Expatriate footballers in Belgium
Turkish expatriate sportspeople in Belgium